The Rmanj Monastery is a Serbian Orthodox monastery dedicated to Saint Nicholas and located in Martin Brod in north-western Bosnia and Herzegovina, at the left bank of the Unac River near its confluence with the Una. The exact year of its construction cannot be determined, though the Rmanj Monastery is the westernmost Serbian Orthodox monastery at the end of the 16th century.The monastery was founded before 1443, when it was first mentioned.

History 
The exact year of the Rmanj monastery cannot be determined, although it was the westernmost Serbian Orthodox monastery at the end of the 16th century.[1] The first reliable information about the existence of the Rmanj monastery is from 1443, at the time of the Serbian migrations due to Turkish pressure, in which the monks from the monastery also participated. The mention of Rmanj monks in the Kruševo monument (end of the 15th century) is the oldest written trace of that monastery, as well as the mention of the Rmanj monastery from 1498, when dukes Petar, Petrašanin and Vukodrag paid for the creation of the icon of the Virgin with Christ, intended for the Rmanj monastery. In the summer of 1515, a silver ark was forged in it by the efforts of the elder Makari, a large silver chalice, and a large silver censer from 1516. Rmanj was the seat of the Metropolitanate of Dabro Bosnia in the second half of the 16th and the first half of the 17th century. During that time, ten metropolitans served in it. After the conquest of this area by the Ottoman Empire, the monastery was temporarily abandoned in 1578. The Bosnian Beylerbeg Teli Hasan Pasha had the Rmanj monastery rebuilt as the seat of his brother, the Orthodox monk Gavrilo Predojević. At the beginning of the 17th century, it became the seat of the Serbian Orthodox Metropolitanate of Dabar-Bosnia and remained in that capacity for about 110 years. After the Turks burned down the monastery in 1663, it was later rebuilt and occupied again in 1737. It was burned again during the Austro-Turkish War of 1787–1791. The Ottoman authorities allowed the rebuilding of the monastery in 1863, and it was rebuilt in two years. It was badly damaged during the anti-Ottoman uprising in Bosnia in 1875 and 1876.[3] The following year, Arthur Evans visited Rmanj (which he wrote as "Ermanja") and in one of his letters described the damage done to the monastery church by troops under the leadership of a Bosnian Muslim feudal lord.[4] The monastery was repaired again in 1883.[3]

In World War II, a field hospital of the Yugoslav Partisans was organised at the monastery. For this reason, it was bombed by the Germans and completely destroyed on 23 April 1944. In 1974, authorities of the Socialist Yugoslavia allowed the renovation of the monastery. Its church was completed in the 1980s, and the foundation of the monks' dormitory was consecrated in 1993. In 1995, during the Croatian Army's Operation Storm, the monastery was shelled and badly damaged. Afterwards, Croatian soldiers mined the monastery's church, but the mines were removed by British soldiers of the SFOR. The dormitory was completed in 2006, and in the following year, the monastery was inhabited by three monks. In 2007, the Rmanj Monastery was proclaimed a National Monument of Bosnia and Herzegovina.

Footnotes

Bibliography

External links 

Official website of the Rmanj Monastery

Serbian Orthodox monasteries in Bosnia and Herzegovina
National Monuments of Bosnia and Herzegovina
Attacks on religious buildings and structures during the Bosnian War
16th-century Serbian Orthodox church buildings
Christian monasteries established in the 16th century
16th-century establishments in Bosnia and Herzegovina
Rebuilt churches in Bosnia and Herzegovina
Destroyed Christian monasteries
Attacks on religious buildings and structures during World War II